Bodhan is a village in the Mandvi taluka in the Surat district of Gujarat state, India. It is located 32km east of the district headquarters, Surat, and 255km from the state capital, Gandhinagar.

Bodhan's pin code is 394140 and the postal head office is Bodhan.

The Tapi River (formerly called Tapati River) runs through the village.

Villages in Surat district